Kenneth Dwone Hicks (born April 25, 1981) is a former American football running back in the National Football League. He was signed by the Tennessee Titans as an undrafted free agent in 2003 and was also a member of the Chicago Bears. He played college football at Middle Tennessee State. Hicks is currently an assistant football coach at Wilson Central High School in Lebanon, Tennessee.

Early years
Hicks played at Washingtonville High School in Washingtonville, New York, for a short time in 1996. He holds that school's single-game rushing record (27 carries for 391 yards).
Hicks transferred to Lee High School in Huntsville, where he was named the Alabama Class 6A State Player of the Year, after rushing for 2,226 yards and 21 touchdowns.

College career
Hicks attended Middle Tennessee State University and was a three-year starter. As a junior, he was a first-team All-Sun Belt Conference selection after rushing for a conference leading 1,143 yards and a school-single season record and a conference leading 20 touchdowns.

See also
 List of Division I FBS rushing touchdown leaders

References

External links
Middle Tennessee Blue Raiders bio

1981 births
Living people
Sportspeople from Huntsville, Alabama
American football running backs
Middle Tennessee Blue Raiders football players
Tennessee Titans players
Cologne Centurions (NFL Europe) players